Gustave-Armand-Henri, comte de Reiset (13 July 1821 – 2 March 1905) was a French diplomat, writer and art collector.

Life
Born at Mont-Saint-Aignan, he was the brother of his fellow collector Frédéric and the politician Jules as well as the nephew of the Napoleonic general Marie Antoine. He entered the diplomatic service in 1840 as attaché then ambassador's secretary in Rome then Frankfurt. He was also conseiller général for the canton of Saint-André-de-l'Eure (1858–1871).

Pope Gregory XVI made him a hereditary Roman count on 21 May 1842 and the title was recognised in France by an ordinance of Louis-Philippe of France dated 6 August the same year, followed by letters patent on 14 November that year. He became chief secretary and chargé d'affaires in Turin on 16 May 1848 and on 20 May 1856 married Marie Ernestine Blanche Le Fébure de Sancy de Parabère, daughter of baron de Sancy de Parabère and granddaughter of general Charles Lefebvre-Desnouettes. 1856 also saw him become minister plenipotentiary to Darmstadt.

He was given an important mission in Italy in 1859 and was sent as ambassador to the Kingdom of Hanover in 1863. He died at his home of Le Breuil-Benoît Abbey, which he had begun to restore in 1842 and where he had built a new church, consecrated in 1854. He was a keen collector and acquired a fireplace from the château de Roujou à Fresnes (Loir-et-Cher) bearing a gilded bronze bas relief showing a bust of Francis I of France in profile - the bust was attributed to Matteo del Nassaro.

Selected works
 1866 : Notice généalogique sur la famille de Reiset originaire de Lorraine : établie en Bourgogne au commencement du XVe et, en 1470, dans le Comtè de Ferrette en Alsace 
1876 : Le château de Crécy et madame de Pompadour
1885 : Modes et usages au temps de Marie-Antoinette (won the Prix Bordin of the Académie française)
1885 : Armorial général ou Registres de la Noblesse de France. (Supplément.) Notice généalogique sur la famille de Reiset
1895 : Généalogie de la famille de Reiset
1901-1903 : Mes souvenirs 3, L'Unité de l'Italie et l'unité de l'Allemagne (preface by Robinet de Cléry)
1904 : Mes souvenirs 2, La Guerre de Crimée et la cour de Napoléon III (preface by Robinet de Cléry)
1903 : Mes souvenirs 1, Les Débuts de l'indépendance italienne (preface by Robinet de Cléry)

Honours
Légion d'honneur – Commandeur
Order of Philip the Magnanimous of Hesse – Grand Cross
Order of Adolphe of Nassau – Grand Cross
Royal Guelphic Order of Hanover – Grand Cross
Hessian Order of Merit – Gold Medal
Order of Saints Maurice and Lazare of Sardinia – Commander
Sacred Military Constantinian Order of Saint George – Knight, First Class
Order of Charles III of Spain – Knight

References

Sources
http://www.academie-francaise.fr/node/16686

French memoirists
French art historians
19th-century French historians
French diplomats
19th-century French writers
20th-century French writers
French art collectors
1821 births
1905 deaths
Commandeurs of the Légion d'honneur
19th-century memoirists